Atenolol is a beta blocker medication primarily used to treat high blood pressure and heart-associated chest pain. Atenolol, however, does not seem to improve mortality in those with high blood pressure. Other uses include the prevention of migraines and treatment of certain irregular heart beats. It is taken by mouth or by injection into a vein. It can also be used with other blood pressure medications.

Common side effects include feeling tired, heart failure, dizziness, depression, and shortness of breath. Other serious side effects include bronchospasm. Use is not recommended during pregnancy and alternative drugs are preferred when breastfeeding. It works by blocking β1-adrenergic receptors in the heart, thus decreasing the heart rate and workload.

Atenolol was patented in 1969 and approved for medical use in 1975. It is on the World Health Organization's List of Essential Medicines. It is available as a generic medication. In 2020, it was the 53rd most commonly prescribed medication in the United States, with more than 12million prescriptions.

Medical uses
Atenolol is used for a number of conditions including hyperthyroidism, hypertension, angina, long QT syndrome, acute myocardial infarction, supraventricular tachycardia, ventricular tachycardia, and the symptoms of alcohol withdrawal.

The role for β-blockers in general in hypertension was downgraded in June 2006 in the United Kingdom, and later in the United States, as they are less appropriate than other agents such as ACE inhibitors, calcium channel blockers, thiazide diuretics and angiotensin receptor blockers, particularly in the elderly.

Side effects

Hypertension treated with a β-blocker such as atenolol, alone or in conjunction with a thiazide diuretic, is associated with a higher incidence of new onset type 2 diabetes mellitus compared to those treated with an ACE inhibitor or angiotensin receptor blocker.  

β-blockers, of which atenolol is mainly studied, provides weaker protection against stroke and mortality in patients over 60 years old compared to other antihypertensive medications. Diuretics may be associated with better cardiovascular and cerebrovascular outcomes than β-blockers in the elderly.

Overdose
Symptoms of overdose are due to excessive pharmacodynamic actions on β1 and also β2-receptors. These include bradycardia (slow heartbeat), severe hypotension with shock, acute heart failure, hypoglycemia and bronchospastic reactions. Treatment is largely symptomatic. Hospitalization and intensive monitoring is indicated. Activated charcoal is useful to absorb the drug. Atropine will counteract bradycardia, glucagon helps with hypoglycemia, dobutamine can be given against hypotension and the inhalation of a β2-mimetic as hexoprenalin or salbutamol will terminate bronchospasms. Blood or plasma atenolol concentrations may be measured to confirm a diagnosis of poisoning in hospitalized patients or to assist in a medicolegal death investigation. Plasma levels are usually less than 3 mg/L during therapeutic administration, but can range from 3–30 mg/L in overdose victims.

Society and culture
Atenolol has been given as an example of how slow healthcare providers are to change their prescribing practices in the face of medical evidence that indicates that a drug is not as effective as others in treating some conditions. In 2012, 33.8 million prescriptions were written to American patients for this drug. In 2014, it was in the top (most common) 1% of drugs prescribed to Medicare patients. Although the number of prescriptions has been declining steadily since limited evidence articles contesting its efficacy was published, it has been estimated that it would take 20 years for doctors to stop prescribing it for hypertension. Despite its diminished efficacy when compared to newer antihypertensive drugs, atenolol and other beta blockers are still a relevant clinical choice for treating some conditions, since beta blockers are a diverse group of medicines with different properties that still requires further research. As consequence, reasons for the popularity of beta blockers cannot be fully attributed to a slow healthcare system – patient compliance factor, such as treatment cost and duration, also affect adherence and popularity of therapy.

References

External links 
 

Acetamides
AstraZeneca brands
Beta blockers
Peripherally selective drugs
1976 in science
Products introduced in 1976
N-isopropyl-phenoxypropanolamines
Wikipedia medicine articles ready to translate